The Happy Family is a 1952 British comedy film directed by Muriel Box and starring Stanley Holloway, Kathleen Harrison and Naunton Wayne. The plot of the film centres on resistance by a family to the disruption caused by the construction of the Festival of Britain. It is also known in the U.S. by the alternative title Mr. Lord Says No. It was an adaptation of a play The Happy Family by Michael Clayton Hutton.

Plot
In 1951, the House of Lords is a grocery shop that sits on the South Bank of the river Thames close to the site of Festival Hall, which is noisily under construction. It is owned by the Lord family, a husband and wife with several children. Lillian Lord runs the shop, while Henry is a British Railways train driver who has worked on the railways for over 30 years and who is just about to retire. He is looking forward to enjoying a quiet retirement at the family shop, looking after his pet hare, Winston, though his spiritualist sister-in-law Ada has had supernatural visions of "men in black" bringing discord.

Their plans are disrupted by the arrival of Filch, a senior civil servant dressed in a black suit. He announces that he is overseeing work on the Festival of Britain, due to begin in just six weeks. He explains that, due to an error by one of the planners, the Lords' shop and house will have to be demolished to allow an entrance route to be built, assuring them that they will be financially compensated and will be moved to a new house in South Harrow. He expects this to settle the matter. However, the Lords are reluctant to leave their house, with Henry demanding £6 million if he is to move; an amount he calculates by Mr Filch's account of the estimate of the monetary value the Festival of Britain will bring.  Filch goes away, hoping either to buy them off eventually or to forcibly evict them.

Filch has underestimated how attached they are to their property, which is a symbol of security and family to them after their years of hardship during the Great Depression and the Second World War, where they lost a son. In an attempt to halt their eviction, the Lords appeal to a series of politicians, including their councillor, mayor and MP. They are eventually sent to the official in charge of the work, who insists it must go ahead. They are served with eviction notices, and demolition is due to begin in a few days. However, they are undaunted, declaring that they would rather go to jail than South Harrow. When it becomes clear that their appeals from political channels are not working, the Lords turn to more active resistance at the urging of Cyril, their daughter's fiancé. They begin barricading their house and preparing to fight the government's attempts to turn them out. At the appointed hour, Filch demands they leave, but they refuse. They are joined by Maurice Hennessey, an ambitious BBC broadcaster hoping to use the case to further his career. He begins a running commentary on the events to the outside world.

Filch brings in a large number of police who attempt to storm the shop, but are driven off by missiles and flour bombs. After the assault descends into chaos, Filch launches a prolonged siege in the hope of starving them out. The Lords soon become a cause célèbre, with support coming in from across the world, putting further pressure on the civil servants who are desperate to get work completed before the Festival begins.

In spite of their popularity, the Lords' situation begins to grow desperate as they run out of food. Just as they are about to give in, Filch arrives and announces that, following the personal intervention of the Prime Minister, the architects have redrawn their plans and the road will now go either side of the shop, thereby saving it from demolition. The film ends with the family including Winston enjoying a day out at the Festival of Britain, with Ada flying into the clouds.

Cast

 Stanley Holloway as Henry Lord
 Kathleen Harrison as Lillian Lord
 Naunton Wayne as Mr. Filch
 Dandy Nichols as Ada
 John Stratton as David
 Eileen Moore as Joan
 Shirley Mitchell as Marina
 Margaret Barton as Anne
 George Cole as Cyril
 Tom Gill – Maurice Hennessey
 Miles Malleson as Mr. Thwaites
 Geoffrey Sumner as Sir Charles Spanniell
 Laurence Naismith as Councillor
 Edward Lexy as Alderman
 Cameron Hall as Mayor
 Hal Osmond as BR Shop Steward
 John Salew as Mr. Granite
 Ernest Butcher as Neighbour
 Lyn Evans as Neighbour
 Michael Ward as BBC announcer
 Richard Wattis as M.P.
 David Keir as Process Server
 Anthony Oliver as Fireman
 Campbell Singer as Policeman
 Peter Martyn as Policeman
 Arthur Hambling as Granger
 Eileen Way as Mrs. Potter

Production
The film was released in the year following the real Festival of Britain which had taken place successfully in 1951. It was given a working title of South Bank Story which was later changed to The Happy Family.

Critical reception
In The New York Times, Bosley Crowther called the film "minor whimsy...penned by that usually clever couple, Muriel and Sydney Box, and played by a cast of character actors who are among the best in the land...But the farce collapses painfully upon them long before the end, and what humor there is sounds so parochial that it belongs in earshot of Waterloo Road or, at most, beyond the range of the clumsily and tediously ridiculed B.B.C."  whereas, in a later review in the Radio Times, Sue Heal described the film as "an innocent, gentle lark, harking back to an infinitely preferable if somewhat mythically rosy era when officialdom was bumptious but owlishly benign, and the "Great Unwashed" behaved like a troupe of good-hearted medieval tumblers. Watch out for a youthful George Cole."

References

Bibliography
 Geraghty, Christine. British cinema in the fifties: gender, genre and the 'new look'''. Routledge, 2000.
 Spicer, Andrew. Sydney Box''. Manchester University Press, 2006.

External links

Review of film at Variety

1952 films
Films directed by Muriel Box
1952 comedy films
British comedy films
Festival of Britain
Films set in London
British films based on plays
British black-and-white films
Films with screenplays by Sydney Box
Films produced by Sydney Box
Films with screenplays by Muriel Box
Films shot at Station Road Studios, Elstree
1950s English-language films
1950s British films